Seth Brooks Binzer (born August 23, 1974), better known by his stage name Shifty Shellshock, is an American musician, best known for being a co-founder and front man of the rap rock band Crazy Town, known for their hit song "Butterfly". He has also had a solo music career and appeared in the reality television series Celebrity Rehab 1 and 2 and Sober House 1 and 2.

Music career

Crazy Town

Binzer met fellow Crazy Town front-man, Bret Mazur, in 1992; they started collaborating under the name The Brimstone Sluggers. By early 1999, they formed the group Crazy Town. In 2000 Crazy Town was signed to tour with Ozzfest; however, they were forced to withdraw after only two weeks when Binzer was arrested after he threw a chair through a window while he was drunk.

The band's single, Butterfly, was a global hit. It peaked at the top of the Billboard Hot 100 and in several other countries including Austria, Denmark, and Norway. The success of the single prompted sales of their debut album, The Gift of Game, to exceed 1.5 million.

Their 2002 follow-up album, Darkhorse, was a commercial failure by comparison, and the band broke up shortly after its release.

Crazy Town announced they had reformed in 2007, and performed live for the first time in five years in August 2009. They released their third album, The Brimstone Sluggers, in 2015.

Solo career

During Crazy Town's hiatus, Binzer collaborated with British producer and musician Paul Oakenfold, contributing vocals to Oakenfold's hit single "Starry Eyed Surprise". The track was for Oakenfold first solo studio album Bunkka. In an interview with Rolling Stone magazine in the US, Binzer said that the track known as "Starry Eyed Surprise" was created after the pair met at a Crazy Town show.

The song peaked at number 41 on the Billboard Hot 100 and number six on the UK Singles Chart in Oakenfold's native United Kingdom. In the latter country, it became Binzer's first top ten song as a solo artist.

Binzer released his own first solo album, Happy Love Sick in 2004. He released two singles from the album: "Slide Along Side" a pan-European hit for Shifty that peaked at number 29 on the UK Singles Chart with moderate chart success in Italy, France, Germany, Sweden and Switzerland. His follow-up single, "Turning Me On", did not chart.

In 2009, Binzer founded Platinum Status Records, though the label did not release material from any other artists.

Shifty and the Big Shots
In 2010, Binzer fronted the group, Shifty and The Big Shots. They released their first single, "Save Me", on July 6, 2010, and followed it up with the single "City of Angels".

Personal life
In a 2001 interview with Rolling Stone, Binzer admitted to spending three months in the California Institution for Men following an attempted burglary, to selling and using recreational drugs over a period of several years, as well as to struggling with drug addiction.

Binzer married Melissa Clark in 2002. They have a son named Halo. In 2011, Clark filed for divorce, citing irreconcilable differences. Binzer dated a woman named Tracy in 2008. They have a son named Gage.

Binzer began a relationship with Jasmine Lennard in 2010. On March 27, 2011, police responded to a report of a domestic disturbance between the pair. Binzer was arrested for outstanding warrants and released later that day. In a video interview with TMZ.com, Binzer stated the disturbance was simply a noise complaint, and that the outstanding warrant was for counter-assaulting a security guard who was using unnecessary force when trying to throw him out of a club. Lennard and Binzer announced their engagement in 2012. Binzer was arrested in February 2012 for battery and cocaine possession, and sentenced to three years' probation; his relationship with Lennard ended shortly thereafter. Binzer and Lennard have a son named Phoenix. In 2013, Lennard asked a California court for exclusive custody of their son, claiming Binzer smoked crack in front of him and once left a crack pipe in his room.

Addiction problems and reality shows
Celebrity Rehab 1

Following his struggle with substance abuse, Binzer was one of nine celebrities featured in the first season of VH1's Celebrity Rehab. Upon arrival at the Pasadena Recovery Center (which was filmed as part of Celebrity Rehabs first episode), Binzer was in a sober state but brought along a couple of Red Stripe beers, which were quickly confiscated. Binzer told Dr. Drew Pinsky that he was motivated to achieve sobriety and admitted that cocaine would be the toughest drug for him to avoid.

Celebrity Rehab 2

He graduated from treatment with the other cast members in the summer of 2007. His sobriety was short-lived and subsequently appeared towards the end of Celebrity Rehab 2. Dr. Drew and Binzer's sponsor retrieved him from his hotel room where he had been using and brought him to the Pasadena Recovery Center where they, along with Bob Forrest, pleaded with him to reenter treatment immediately. Binzer agreed to reenter treatment but said he needed "an hour or two" to "chill" and "get a cup of coffee", so he could ready himself for treatment. Realizing that his subterfuge was not fooling anyone (he wanted the time to have another fix), he admitted his intentions saying, "Even though I don't like the drugs, I like 'em". As Binzer got up to leave, the worn-out Dr. Drew said to Binzer's sponsor: "If he stops breathing, call the paramedics." Under the supervision of his sponsor, Binzer scored drugs, returned to the rehab facility that night in an intense state of crack cocaine-induced intoxication, and smoked the remainder of his crack on the roof. He eventually entered the facility and reentered treatment.

Sober House 1

Binzer also appeared on a follow-up show titled Sober House. However, on July 25, 2008, while shooting scenes for the show, Binzer was insulted at a club and responded by walking out on production and embarking on a heavy relapse. To the annoyance of Dr. Drew, Bob Forrest, and several of his housemates, he treated his relapse like a game and sent everyone coded videos on his MySpace about his current location. William Smith, an employee of Dr. Drew, eventually sought out Binzer at a motel and brought him back to the rehab facility. An embarrassed Binzer pledged to Smith and Dr. Drew that the binge he embarked on was his last. On the show's final episode, Binzer is shown in the preliminary stages of being signed to a record producer for a new song, and resolves to stay sober.

Sober House 2

On the August 30, 2009 episode of Loveline, Dr. Drew gave an emotional eulogy to his good friend and Binzer's former bandmate Adam Goldstein, who had died two days previously from an accidental drug overdose shortly after breaking 11 years of sobriety. During the tribute, Dr. Drew mentioned that Binzer's problems with addiction continued after Sober House 1, eventually leading Binzer to take part in Sober House 2. When filming for Sober House 2 began, Dr. Drew got a "distress call" from Seth (filmed as part of the season's second episode) and the two met, with Seth revealing to Drew that his thirst for drugs was still very much active, and that he needed more help. Dr. Drew reluctantly allowed him to take part in the show and firmly stated that it would be the last time Drew gave him treatment. Dr. Drew voiced his hope that Goldstein's death would inspire Binzer to remain sober. Binzer later thanked Dr. Drew for his tough love.

Coma hospitalization

On 29 March 2012 Binzer was admitted to hospital after losing consciousness. Binzer awakened from the coma and was later released from hospital.

Discography

For his discography in Crazy Town, see the Crazy Town discography section

Albums

Singles

As Shifty & The Big Shots
2010: "Save Me"
2010: "City of Angels" 
2010: "Never Give Up"

Others
2006: "Greatest Lovers" (Shellshock & Pony Boy)

Filmography
Binzer had a minor role in the 1994 film Clifford, and played the lead role in the 2004 short film Willowbee. Binzer also had a small appearance in the 2005 film Hustle & Flow. In 1995, he took part in Shark Hunters: Ultimate Tournament Series TV series. He also appeared in the 2016 film Dead 7.

References

External links
 Official website (archived)
 
 Seth Binzer Videos

1974 births
21st-century American rappers
American rappers
American rock singers
Jewish American musicians
Jewish rappers
Jewish heavy metal musicians
Living people
Nu metal singers
Participants in American reality television series
Rappers from California
Rappers from Los Angeles
21st-century American Jews